Los Mero Meros is a compilation album by various artists presented by Lennox.

Track listing 
 "Ahí Na Más"
 "Abuso" (featuring Zion)
 "Los Mero Meros" (Lennox Ft Guelo Star & DJ Blass)
 "Me Han Copiao Demasiado" (Don Chezina)
 "El Movimiento Preciso" (Zurdo)
 "No Hacen Na" (Lennox Ft Tommy Viera, Q-Killa, Newtone, Carlos & Omy)
 "Mi Amor" (Lennox Ft Carlos & Omy, Newtone)
 "Tú Lo Ves Como Frontean" (Reyo)
 "Persígueme" (Lennox Ft Carlos & Omy, Newtone)
 "Gallo De Pelea" (Jaycko)
 "Sé" (Newtone & Lennox ft. Carlos & Omy)
 "Un Amor Asi" (Lennox Ft Newtone)
 "Me Pones Mal" (Newtone Ft Carlos & Omy)
 "Amor Sin Tu Carino" (Carlos & Omy Ft Reyo)
 "Yo Te Vi" (La Sista)
 "Así Así" (Tommy Viera Ft Black Label Maldy & Jenny) 
 "Motivation" (Carlos & Omy)
 "Inconcientemente" (Maldy Ft Baby Blue) 
 "Dime Si Tú Quieres" (Lennox Ft Carlos & Omy) 
 "Envidia" (Lennox)
 "Centro de Atención" (Newtone)
 "No Te Procupes Por Mí" (Lennox Ft Chayanne) (prod. by Mambo Kingz)
 "Envidia (Remix)" (Lennox Ft Los Goyos)

Reggaeton compilation albums
2007 compilation albums